The 103rd New York State Legislature, consisting of the New York State Senate and the New York State Assembly, met from January 6 to May 27, 1880, during the first year of Alonzo B. Cornell's governorship, in Albany.

Background
Under the provisions of the New York Constitution of 1846, 32 Senators and 128 assemblymen were elected in single-seat districts; senators for a two-year term, assemblymen for a one-year term. The senatorial districts were made up of entire counties, except New York County (seven districts) and Kings County (three districts). The Assembly districts were made up of entire towns, or city wards, forming a contiguous area, all within the same county.

On April 23, 1879, the Legislature re-apportioned the Senate districts; and the Assembly seats per county. Columbia, Delaware, Madison, Oneida, Ontario and Oswego counties lost one seat each; Kings and New York counties gained three seats each.

At this time there were two major political parties: the Republican Party and the Democratic Party. Tammany Hall Boss John Kelly engaged in a fierce struggle against the Democratic majority led by Samuel J. Tilden and Lucius Robinson, and ran as a "spoiler candidate" to defeat Gov. Robinson who ran for re-election.

The Prohibition Party, the Greenback Party, the Socialist Labor Party of America, the "Working Men" and the "Jeffersonian Democrats" also nominated tickets.

Elections
The New York state election, 1879 was held on November 4. Republicans Alonzo B. Cornell and George G. Hoskins were elected Governor and Lieutenant Governor. Of the other five statewide elective office up for election, four were carried by the Republicans, and one by a Democrat. The approximate party strength at this election, as expressed by the vote for Governor, was: Republican 419,000; Democratic 376,000; Tammany Hall 78,000; Greenback 20,000; and Prohibition 4,500.

Sessions
The Legislature met for the regular session at the State Capitol in Albany on January 6, 1880; and adjourned on May 27.

George H. Sharpe (R) was elected Speaker with 90 votes against 33 for John Shanley (D).

William H. Robertson was re-elected President pro tempore of the State Senate.

On April 6, the Legislature re-elected Superintendent of Public Instruction Neil Gilmour to a third term of three years.

State Senate

Districts

 1st District: Queens and Suffolk counties
 2nd District: 1st, 2nd, 5th, 6th, 8th, 9th, 10th, 12th and 22nd Ward of the City of Brooklyn, and the towns of Flatbush, Gravesend and New Utrecht in Kings County
 3rd District: 3rd, 4th, 7th, 11th, 13th, 19th, 20th, 21st and 23rd Ward of the City of Brooklyn
 4th District: 14th, 15th, 16th, 17th, 18th, 24th and 25th Ward of the City of Brooklyn, and the towns of New Lots and Flatlands in Kings County
 5th District: Richmond County and the 1st, 2nd, 3rd, 5th, 6th, 8th, 14th and parts of the 4th and 9th Ward of New York City
 6th District: 7th, 11th, 13th and part of the 4th Ward of NYC
 7th District: 10th, 17th and part of the 15th, 18th and 21st Ward of NYC
 8th District: 16th and part of the 9th, 15th, 18th, 20th and 21st Ward of NYC
 9th District: Part of the 18th, 19th and 21st Ward of NYC
 10th District: Part of the 12th, 19th, 20th, 21st and 22nd Ward of NYC
 11th District: 23rd and 24th, and part of the 12th, 20th and 22nd Ward of NYC
 12th District: Rockland and Westchester counties
 13th District: Orange and Sullivan counties
 14th District: Greene, Schoharie and Ulster counties
 15th District: Columbia, Dutchess and Putnam counties
 16th District: Rensselaer and Washington counties
 17th District: Albany County
 18th District: Fulton, Hamilton, Montgomery, Saratoga and Schenectady counties
 19th District: Clinton, Essex and Warren counties
 20th District: Franklin, Lewis and St. Lawrence counties
 21st District: Oswego and Jefferson counties
 22nd District: Oneida County
 23rd District: Herkimer, Madison and Otsego counties
 24th District: Chenango, Delaware and Broome counties
 25th District: Onondaga and Cortland counties
 26th District: Cayuga, Seneca, Tompkins and Tioga counties
 27th District: Allegany, Chemung and Steuben counties
 28th District:  Ontario, Schuyler, Wayne and Yates counties
 29th District: Monroe and Orleans counties
 30th District: Genesee, Livingston, Niagara and Wyoming counties
 31st District: Erie County
 32nd District: Cattaraugus and Chautauqua counties

Note: There are now 62 counties in the State of New York. The counties which are not mentioned in this list had not yet been established, or sufficiently organized, the area being included in one or more of the abovementioned counties.

Members
The asterisk (*) denotes members of the previous Legislature who continued in office as members of this Legislature. Jacob Seebacher, Ferdinand Eidman, Robert H. Strahan and Waters W. Braman changed from the Assembly to the Senate.

Employees
 Clerk: John W. Vrooman
 Sergeant-at-Arms: John W. Corning
 Doorkeeper: James G. Caw
 Stenographer: Hudson C. Tanner

State Assembly

Assemblymen
The asterisk (*) denotes members of the previous Legislature who continued as members of this Legislature.

Party affiliations follow the vote for Speaker.

Employees
 Clerk: Edward M. Johnson
 Sergeant-at-Arms: Sidney M. Robinson
 Doorkeeper: Henry Wheeler
 First Assistant Doorkeeper: Michael Maher
 Second Assistant Doorkeeper: John W. Wheeler
Assistant Doorkeeper: John Christie
 Stenographer: Worden E. Payne

Notes

Sources
 Civil List and Constitutional History of the Colony and State of New York compiled by Edgar Albert Werner (1884; see pg. 276 for Senate districts; pg. 291 for senators; pg. 298–304 for Assembly districts; and pg. 379 for assemblymen)
 Journal of the Assembly (103rd Session) (1880)

103
1880 in New York (state)
1880 U.S. legislative sessions